There are fifteen parliamentary committees in the Riksdag, Sweden's parliament. Each committee is made up of seventeen elected MPs, with at least one member from each political party. Additionally, the committee on EU Affairs, while not one of the standing committees, has a similar role.

Current committees
Civil Affairs
The Committee on Civil Affairs was formed on 1 October 2006. This committee overtook issues that were previously handled by the Committee on Civil Law and the Committee on Housing. Currently the committee is chaired by Emma Hult of the Green Party, and as vice-Speaker Larry Söder of the Christian Democrats.

The Constitution
The first Committee on the Constitution was established in the Riksdag of the Estates in May 1809. The committee played a decisive role in bringing about a new Instrument of Government, which was adopted on 6 June 1809. The existence of a Committee on the Constitution and other parliamentary committees was further regulated in the current Instrument of Government from 1974.
The committee prepares matters concerning the Fundamental Laws of the Realm and the Riksdag Act and certain other legislation. The current chairman is Karin Enström of the Moderate Party. And as vice-Speaker Hans Ekström of the Social Democratic Party.

Cultural Affairs
Led by Christer Nylander (Liberals), vice-Speaker Vasiliki Tsouplaki of the Left Party, as of 2019, the second vice-Speaker Lotta Finstorp of the Moderate Party, along with the third vice-Speaker Lawen Redar of the Social Democratic Party.

Defence
Since 2020 the committee is led by Pål Jonson of Moderate Party, and since 2019 the committee's vice-Speaker is Niklas Karlsson of the Social Democratic Party.

Education
Social Democrat Gunnilla Svantorp leads the committee, along with vice-Speaker Roger Haddad of the Liberal Party since 2018 and since 2019, the second vice-Speaker Kristina Axén Olin.

Environment and Agriculture
Chaired currently by Kristina Yngwe (Center Party), along with vice-Speaker Maria Gardfjell for the Green Party, and since 2020 as second vice-Speaker Jessica Rosencrantz of the Moderate Party.

Finance
The current chair of the committee is Fredrik Olovsson of the Social Democrats. The vice-Speaker of the committee is Elisabeth Svantesson for the Modreate Party.

Foreign Affairs
The current chairman of the committee is Kenneth G. Forslund of the Social Democrats Since 2019, the vice-Speaker of the committee is Hans Wallmark from the Moderate Party

Health and Welfare
Emma Henriksson of Christian Democrats is the committee chairperson, along with vice-Speaker Kristina Nilsson for the Social Democrats.

Industry and Trade
Current chairman is Lars Hjälmered (Moderate Party) along with vice-Speaker Anna-Caren Sätherberg for the Social Democrats.

Justice
Established in 1971, the committee considers matters concerning the judicial system, the Penal Code, and the Code of Judicial Procedure 
The current speaker of the committee is Fredrik Lundh Sammeli of the Social Democrats along with Andreas Carlson of the Christian Democrats.
().

The Labour Market
Anna Johansson of Social Democrats leads the work in the committee, along with vice-Speaker of the committee Gulan Avci from the Liberal Party, and Mats Green of the Moderate Party

Social Insurance
Moderate Maria Malmer Stenergard currently chairs the committee, along with vice-Speaker Rikard Larsson of the Social Democrats.

Taxation
The current chair is Jörgen Hellman of Swedish Social Democratic Party, along with Per Åsling of the Center Party. Since 2019, the second vice-Speaker of the committee Niklas Wykman of the Moderate Party.

Transport and Communications
Currently chaired by Jens Holm of the Left Party. The vice-Speaker is Anders Åkesson of the Center Party, along with second vice-Speaker Magnus Jacobsson of the Christian Democrats, and third vice-Speaker Teres Lindberg of the Social Democrats.

Joint Foreign Affairs and Defense Committee

European Union Affairs
In consultation with the government, this committee is responsible for formulating Sweden's policies at the Council of Ministers meetings. The chair of the committee is Åsa Westlund (Social Democrats), since 2019, the vice-Speaker Annika Qarlsson of the Center Party, and second vice-Speaker Jessika Roswall of the Moderate Party.

Former committees
There are six committees that no longer meet:
 Secret Committee
 Committee on the State
 Committee on General Affairs and the Economy
 Committee on the Accords
 Committee on Civil Law
 Committee on Housing

See also
War Delegation

References

External links